is a Japanese actress, voice actress, singer and narrator from Hino, Tokyo. She is represented by Aoni Production. Her debut role was the title character in Hello! Sandybell in 1981. She has voiced many major roles in 1980s and 1990s anime such as Fight! Iczer One, Gall Force, Saint Seiya, Magical Taluluto, and RG Veda.

Biography

Filmography

Anime

Drama audio recordings
Yamamoto has voiced in drama CDs and cassettes.

Video games

References

External links
 Official agency profile 
 

1960 births
Living people
Voice actresses from Tokyo
Japanese video game actresses
Japanese voice actresses
20th-century Japanese actresses
21st-century Japanese actresses
20th-century Japanese women singers
20th-century Japanese singers
21st-century Japanese women singers
21st-century Japanese singers
Aoni Production voice actors